Cynthia Mamle Morrison (born 17 January 1964) is a Ghanaian politician and a member of the New Patriotic Party. She is currently the member of parliament for Agona West Constituency. On 9 August 2018, she was appointed Minister designate for Gender, Children and Social Protection by President Nana Akufo-Addo. She was formally the Minister for Gender, Children and Social Protection.

Early life and education
Cynthia Morrison was born on 17 January 1964 in Elmina in the Central Region. She acquired a Teacher Training Certificate at Maria Montessori Training School in 1992 and also in Hepziba Montessori. She also has certificates in catering from Flair Catering.

Career 
She was the executive director and a Manager of her own company. She was also the Proprietress of Maryland Montessori in Dansoman. She is currently the Minister for Gender, Children and Social Protection.

Philanthropy 
Cynthia Morrison donated items including wheel chairs, walking coaches for the blind and crutches as part of her 52nd birthday celebration.

Politics 
Morrison is a member of the New Patriotic Party. She is currently the Member of parliament for Agona West Constituency in the Central Region.

2016 elections 
She won this seat during the 2016 Ghanaian general elections. Two other candidates namely Charles Obeng-Inkoom of National Democratic Congress and Evans Idan Coffie of Convention People's Party also contested in the 2016 by-election of the Agona West constituency held in 2016. Cynthia won the election by obtaining 32,770 votes out of the 56,878 cast, representing 58.03 percent of total valid votes.

2020 elections 
She contested the 2020 Ghanaian general election as the parliamentary candidate for the New Patriotic Party and was elected for a second four-year term. She polled 30,513 out of a total of 59,193 valid votes cast as against Paul Ofori-Amoah of the opposition National Democratic Congress who had 27,673 votes, and an Independent candidate Ishmael Kofi Tekyi Turkson had 1,007 votes.

Committees 
She is the Chairperson of the Government Assurance Committee and also the Chairperson of the Communications Committee.

Personal life
She is married to Herbert Morrison with seven children. She identifies as a Christian.

References

New Patriotic Party politicians
21st-century Ghanaian women politicians
Living people
1964 births
Ghanaian MPs 2021–2025
Accra Girls Senior High School alumni